BH (renamed on 2 July 2012; formerly known as Berita Harian) is a Malay-language daily newspaper published in Malaysia owned by the New Straits Times Press. It was first published on 1 July 1957 as the first mainstream newspaper in Malaysia. Its Sunday Edition, BH Ahad (renamed on 1 July 2012; previously known as Berita Minggu), was launched on 10 July 1960.

Overview
The newspaper was printed in broadsheet format until 5 July 2008, when the newspaper sported a newer, more compact look. In the 2000s, it also began to target younger readers more.

The paper underwent a huge transition on 1 July 2012 in which several changes were made, including renaming the 'Ekonomi' section to 'Bisnes', the pullout ‘Ratu’ to ‘Famili’ and ‘Rona’ to ‘Kembara’. Changes were also made in layout, typography and pagination.

History 

On 1 July, 1957, the inaugural issue of Berita Harian, the first romanised Malay morning newspaper was published. The first romanised Malay Sunday newspaper edition, Berita Minggu, was launched on 10 July, 1960. Initially, it reflected the contents of the Straits Times and was priced at RM0.15 with only 8 staff operating the paper. Abdul Samad Ismail was appointed as the first editor in April of 1958. Its masthead was updated on 1 January, 1966, and it launched cartoonist Lat's Keluarga Si Mamat cartoon series in the Sunday edition in 1968. In 1972, Ismail was replaced by Abdul Wahab Zain as editor. The newspaper was expanded in 1974 from 10 to 12 pages, with new content focusing on trade, photography, advice, foreign news and entertainment. The next year, on 1 July, 1975, the price was increased to RM0.25. Abdul Samad Said became editor in 1976, before being replaced by Salim Kajai in 1978. Edisi Bandar Berita Harian was launched on 29 November, 1979. Berita Harian was overhauled in 1981, and got a new masthead colour and sections, as well as expanded entertainment content. Its price was raised to RM0.35, before being raised again to RM0.45 in 1983. The same year, Adibah Amin became editor. Ahmad Sebi Abu Bakar became group editor the year after. 

Berita Harian and Berita Minggu were merged into Berita Harian Sdn Bhd on 19 June, 1985, and on 20 October Akhbar Dalam Darjah was launched. Bakar was replaced as group editor in April 1986 by Abdul Kadir Jasin, before being replaced himself by Ahmad Nazri Abdullah on 8 April, 1988. The newspapers sports section was expanded on 8 August, 1989, to include Jaguh, a 16-page special tabloid pullout. Berita Harian and Berita Minggu were overhauled in December 1991. Berita Harian gained a new tagline, "Sumber Ilmu dan Maklumat Mutakhir", while Minggu saw its format changed. Special daily supplements were added: Berita Pelajar, Berita Wanita, Berita Teknologi, Jaguh, Perspektif and Dunia on 1 June, 1992. In May of 1993, a Komputer subsection was added to the technology content. The subsection would be expanded to a pullout on 5 January, 1994, before Berita Komputer was launched on 11 August. Later in 1993, Minda Pelajar was added, and the newspaper price was raised to RM0.70. At this point, the paper was printing 50,000 issues weekly. The newspaper was overhauled in January, 1995, where fonts, images, layouts and sections were edited. Notably, the newspaper shifted its attention from regional to national and foreign news. A weekly edition, titled Citra, was launched in February, sold at RM1.00. It was discontinued and its last edition published on 31 January, 2000. Ahmad Rejal Arbee was appointed group editor in July 1998. Later, in November, the price was increased to RM1.20 and the sections were reorganised.

Berita Harian and Berita Minggu were both redesigned in 1999. Its educational sections were expanded in 2001. Their aesthetics were again edited in January 2003, especially to target younger readers, adding a pullout called IKON on Saturdays in October for youth. In March, the entertainment sections were revamped as well. Hishamuddin Aun was appointed group editor on 18 July. By 2004, circulation had increased to 238,000 daily, and the paper added front-page stories for each region. Malaysia Super League content was added in February on the first Thursday of every month. Zian Johari became Executive Editor of Berita Minggu on 1 June, 2004. The cover price of Berita Harian was raised to RM1.50, except for in Sabah and Sarawak, where it was raised to RM2.00. Berita Minggu's price was raised to RM2.00 nationally. The two papers were again revamped in June. Come April 2006, Datuk Manja Ismail was appointed Group Editor and Director of Malay publications and the newspaper added a cellphone service for readers to receive news digitally. In March, 2008, Datuk Mustapa Omar was appointed Deputy Group Editor. In July, Berita Harian and Minggu ceased their broadsheet format after 51 years, and went compact. In July 2009, Datuk Mior Kamarul Shahid and Mahfar Ali were appointed Group Editor and Deputy Group Editor respectively at Berita Harian. After launching in 2009, Berita Harian became by October 2010 the number one online newspaper in Malaysia.

See also 
Other Malay language newspapers in Malaysia:
Utusan Malaysia
Harian Metro
Kosmo!
Utusan Borneo, a newspaper publication for the state of Sabah and Sarawak
Sinar Harian
List of Malaysian television stations
8TV
List of Malaysian radio stations
8FM

References

External links
 

Media Prima
1957 establishments in British Malaya
Newspapers published in Malaysia
Malay-language newspapers
Publications established in 1957
Mass media in Kuala Lumpur